Shady Grove is an unincorporated community in Pulaski County, in the U.S. state of Missouri.

Shady Grove once had a schoolhouse, Shady Grove School.

References

Unincorporated communities in Pulaski County, Missouri
Unincorporated communities in Missouri